As distinct from the Western medical concept of the pericardium, this concept from traditional Chinese medicine describes a set of interrelated parts rather than an anatomical organ.  (See Zang Fu theory.)

The Pericardium is also called the "heart protector", and, for clinical purposes, is considered a yin organ paired with the yang organ San Jiao.  In general theory, the Pericardium is not distinguished from the Heart.  It is also the first line of defence against the Heart from External Pathogenic Influences. The Pericardium has a meridian named for it, which reflects the health of the organ.  In terms of the Five Elements, these organs are both associated with the fire element.  According to traditional Chinese medicine, it is often best to approach the treatment of heart problems via the Pericardium, rather than the heart directly.  

Traditional Chinese medicine